WGZO-LP (98.7 FM, "Heartbeat 98.7") is a radio station licensed to serve the community of Bloomfield, Connecticut. The station is owned by Connecticut Valley Hispanic Outreach and airs an urban gospel format.

The station was assigned the WGZO-LP call letters by the Federal Communications Commission on October 31, 2014.

References

External links
 Official Website
 FCC Public Inspection File for WGZO-LP
 

GZO-LP
Radio stations established in 2015
2015 establishments in Connecticut
Gospel radio stations in the United States
Hartford County, Connecticut
GZO-LP